Michalis Kamperidis (alternate spelling: Michail) (Greek: Μιχάλης Καμπερίδης; born April 24, 1994) is a Greek professional basketball player who last played for PAOK of the Greek Basket League and the Basketball Champions League. He is a 2.06 m (6 ft 9 in) tall power forward, that can also play as a center.

Professional career 
After playing youth basketball with Mandraikos, Kamperidis played semi-pro basketball in the Greek 3rd Division, with the Greek club Filathlitikos, in the 2011–12 season. He then began his professional career in the 2012–13 season, with Filathlitikos, playing in the Greek 2nd Division. He declared for the 2014 NBA draft, but went undrafted. In 2014, he moved to the Greek First Division club AEK Athens.

On 22 January 2015, he was loaned to the Spanish 2nd Division club Peñas Huesca. On 29 July 2015, he was loaned to the Greek club Rethymno Cretan Kings, where he spent two seasons. With AEK, he won the Greek Cup title, in 2018, as well as the FIBA Champions League's 2018 championship.

He moved to the Greek club Holargos in 2018. On June 4, 2019, Kamperidis returned to the Rethymno Cretan Kings, signing a two-year contract. He averaged 4.9 points and 3.1 rebounds per game. On August 26, 2020, Kamperidis signed with Larisa.

On August 2, 2021, Kamperidis signed with PAOK, joining his younger brother Georgios. On January 31, 2022, he mutually parted ways with the club.

National team career
As a member of the junior national basketball teams of Greece, Kamperidis participated at the 2011 FIBA Europe Under-18 Championship, the 2012 FIBA Europe Under-18 Championship, the 2013 FIBA Europe Under-20 Championship, and the 2014 FIBA Europe Under-20 Championship.

Personal life
Kamperidis' younger brother, Georgios, is also a professional basketball player. Kamperidis has been one of the best point guards on the European 2K Pro Am scene. He has been the leader of Paladins Gaming and member of Rethymno Cretan Kings eSports. In January 2019, he decided to launch his NBA 2K career, and he reached an overall player rating of 99, with his sharpshooting play-maker player. In 2020 Kamperidis decided to move again on Rethymno Cretan Kings eSports.

References

External links
Official Twitter Account
FIBA Europe Profile
Eurobasket.com Profile
Greek Basket League Profile 
ESPN.com Profile
RealGM.com Profile
ProBasketballOverSeas.com Profile
NBADraft.Net Profile

1994 births
Living people
AEK B.C. players
CB Peñas Huesca players
Centers (basketball)
EFAO Zografou B.C. players
Greek expatriate basketball people in Spain
Greek men's basketball players
Holargos B.C. players
Larisa B.C. players
P.A.O.K. BC players
Power forwards (basketball)
Rethymno B.C. players
Basketball players from Athens